Ribnikar is a Serbian surname. Notable people with the surname include:

Darko F. Ribnikar (1878–1914), Serbian journalist
Vladislav F. Ribnikar (1871–1914), Serbian journalist, brother of Darko
 (1912–2007), Serbian writer

Serbian surnames